Iberia Parish School System is a school district headquartered in New Iberia, Louisiana, United States. The district serves all of Iberia Parish and all of the city of Delcambre, which has portions located in Vermilion Parish.

School uniforms
Beginning in the 2000–2001 school year all students in the system from pre-Kindergarten to the 12th Grade are required to wear school uniforms.

Schools

6–12 schools 
 Delcambre High School  (Delcambre, in Vermilion Parish)

7–12 schools 
 Loreauville High School  (Loreauville)

9–12 schools 
 Jeanerette Senior High School  (Unincorporated area)
 New Iberia Senior High School  (New Iberia)
 Westgate High School  (Unincorporated area)

7–8 schools 
 Anderson Middle School (New Iberia)
 Belle Place Middle School (Unincorporated area)
 Iberia Middle School (Unincorporated area)
 Jeanerette Middle School (Jeanerette)

K–6 schools 
 Caneview Elementary School (New Iberia)
 Center Street Elementary School (New Iberia)
 Coteau Elementary School (Unincorporated area)
 Daspit Elementary School (New Iberia)
 Dodson Elementary School (New Iberia)
 Hopkins Elementary School (New Iberia)
 Jeanerette Elementary School (Jeanerette)
 Johnston Elementary School (New Iberia)
 Loreauville Elementary School (Loreauville)
 North Lewis Elementary School (New Iberia)
 North Street Elementary School (New Iberia)
 Park Elementary School (New Iberia)
 Peebles Elementary School (Unincorporated area)
 Pesson Elementary School (New Iberia)
 Sugarland Elementary School (Unincorporated area)

3–6 schools 
 St. Charles Elementary School (Jeanerette)

Pre-K–5 schools 
 Delcambre Elementary School (Delcambre, in Vermilion Parish)

K–2 schools 
 Magnolia Elementary School (New Iberia)

Preschools
 Live Oak Preschool (New Iberia)

Former schools
 Avery Island Elementary School (Avery Island, K–6 Unincorporated area) (closed 2008) - Students were rezoned to Center Street Elementary School
 Bank Avenue Elementary School (New Iberia, 5–6)
 Canal Elementary School (K–2, Jeanerette)
 Grand Marais Elementary School (K–2, Unincorporated area)
 Lee Street Alternative School (Alternative, New Iberia)

Former school board members

Bo Ackal, state representative, 1972–1996

References

External links

 Iberia Parish School System

Education in Iberia Parish, Louisiana
Education in Vermilion Parish, Louisiana

School districts in Louisiana